Harry Tate was an English comedian.

Harry Tate may also refer to:
Harry Tate (cricketer) (1862–1949), English cricketer
Harry Tate (soccer) (1886–1954), American amateur football (soccer) player

See also
Harry Tait, character in Paradise Beach
Harold Tate (disambiguation)
Henry Tate (disambiguation)